Rattanaphon Pakkaratha (born ) is a Thai female weightlifter, competing in the 53 kg category and representing Thailand at international competitions. 

She won a gold medal at the 2014 Summer Youth Olympic Games.
She competed at world championships, at the 2015 World Weightlifting Championships.

Major results

References

1997 births
Living people
Rattanaphon Pakkaratha
Place of birth missing (living people)
Youth Olympic gold medalists for Thailand
Rattanaphon Pakkaratha
Weightlifters at the 2014 Summer Youth Olympics